The 2018  Faun Environnement - Classic de l'Ardèche Rhône Crussol was the 18th edition of the Classic Sud-Ardèche road cycling one day race. It was part of UCI Europe Tour in category 1.1.

Teams
Twenty-two teams were invited to take part in the race. These included five UCI World Tour teams, thirteen UCI Professional Continental teams, three UCI Continental teams and one national team.

General classification

External links

References

2018 UCI Europe Tour
2018 in French sport
Classic Sud-Ardèche